Hallett is an extinct town in Mississippi County, in the U.S. state of Missouri.

The community was named after Frank and Miles Howlett, the original owners of the town site.

References

Ghost towns in Missouri
Former populated places in Mississippi County, Missouri